Phase angle may refer to:
Phase (waves), the angular displacement of a sinusoid from a reference point or time
Phasor angle, angular component of the complex number representation of a sinusoid
Analytic representation phase, instantaneous phase of an analytic signal representation
Phase angle (astronomy), the angle between the incident light and reflected light

See also
Angle
Polar coordinate system